The 1982 Austrian motorcycle Grand Prix was the second round of the 1982 Grand Prix motorcycle racing season. It took place on the weekend of 30 April–2 May 1982 at the Salzburgring.

Classification

500 cc

References

Austrian motorcycle Grand Prix
Austrian
Motorcycle Grand Prix